Carl Wilhelm Louis (Ludwig) Grabow (1790 – 19 January 1859) was a German entomologist especially interested in Coleoptera and Lepidoptera.

Grabow was born in Prenzlau.  He was an insect dealer in Dresden and a friend and associate of the younger Otto Staudinger.  He collected insects in Germany, Spain and Portugal.

References 
 Hesselbart, G.; Oorschot, H. van & Wagener, S. 1995 ''Die Tagfalter der Türkei unter Berücksichtigung der angrenzenden Länder.- Bocholt, Selbstverlag S. Wagener.

1790 births
1859 deaths
People from Prenzlau
German lepidopterists
19th-century German zoologists